The 1936–37 SK Rapid Wien season was the 39th season in club history.

Squad

Squad and statistics

Squad statistics

Fixtures and results

League

Cup

References

1936-37 Rapid Wien Season
Rapid